Chris Leikvoll (born 4 December 1975) is an Australian former professional rugby league footballer who played in the 1990s and 2000s.

Background
Born into an English Australian family in Sydney, New South Wales. Leikvoll's surname comes from his Norwegian grandfather.

Playing career
Leikvoll made his debut for Illawarra in round 12 1997 against South Sydney which ended in a 28–28 draw.  Leikvoll played in the club's final ever game as a stand-alone entity which was a 25–24 loss to Canterbury.

It was the joint venture's first season in the premiership.

Leikvoll signed with the Warrington Wolves from St George Illawarra Dragons in 2004 until November 2006. Leikvoll has an EU passport, so he did not count on the overseas quota.

References

External links
Profile at warringtonwolves.com
Profile at concreteboots.com (Illawarra Steelers)

1975 births
Australian rugby league players
Australian people of English descent
Australian people of Norwegian descent
Australian expatriate sportspeople in England
Illawarra Steelers players
St. George Illawarra Dragons players
Warrington Wolves players
Rugby league props
Living people
Rugby league players from Sydney